Inferi may refer to:
Inferi, also di inferi or dii inferi, the collective gods of the underworld in ancient Rome
Inferi (Harry Potter), corpses controlled through a Dark wizard's spells in Harry Potter

See also
 Ava Inferi, a Portuguese band